Wellsville is the name of several locations in the United States: 

Wellsville, Kansas 
Wellsville, Missouri
Wellsville (town), New York 
Wellsville (village), New York 
Wellsville, Ohio 
Wellsville, Pennsylvania 
Wellsville, Utah